Hunter Pendleton Sulte (born April 25, 2002) is an American soccer player who plays as a goalkeeper for Portland Timbers in Major League Soccer.

Club career
Born in Anchorage, Alaska, Sulte left his hometown when he has 13 to attend a soccer academy in Portland, Oregon. After playing with the Portland Timbers academy, Sulte appeared for Portland's USL Championship side Portland Timbers 2 on March 7, 2020, starting in a 6–1 loss to Phoenix Rising. He had previously appeared with the club on the bench during their 2018 and 2019 seasons.

On November 11, 2020, it was announced that Sulte would join Portland's MLS roster as a homegrown player from the 2021 season. He is the first player from Alaska to sign an MLS Homegrown contract with an MLS club.

On May 1, 2021, Sulte made his MLS debut starting in a 4-1 loss to FC Dallas. At the age of 19 years and 6 days, Sulte became the second youngest goalkeeper to start an MLS match. Sulte, 6 ft 7in, became the tallest goalkeeper in MLS history to play in a match.

References

External links
 

2002 births
Living people
Association football goalkeepers
American soccer players
Homegrown Players (MLS)
Portland Timbers players
Portland Timbers 2 players
Soccer players from Alaska
USL Championship players
Major League Soccer players
MLS Next Pro players